This is a list of the National Register of Historic Places listings in Irion County, Texas.

This is intended to be a complete list of properties and districts listed on the National Register of Historic Places in Irion County, Texas. There is one property listed on the National Register in the county.

Current listings

The locations of National Register properties may be seen in a mapping service provided.

|}

See also

National Register of Historic Places listings in Texas
Recorded Texas Historic Landmarks in Irion County

References

External links

Irion County, Texas
Irion County
Buildings and structures in Irion County, Texas